The castra of Pietroasele was one of the forts erected by Emperor Constantine the Great on the north bank of the river Danube after his victory over the Goths in 328. It was abandoned in the same century. The ruins of the castra are located in the center of Pietroasele (Romania).

See also
List of castra

Notes

External links
Roman castra from Romania - Google Maps / Earth

Roman legionary fortresses in Romania
History of Muntenia
Historic monuments in Buzău County